FKA may refer to:
 Fazilka Junction railway station, in Punjab, India
 Federal Kidnapping Act, in the United States
 Fender Katsalidis Architects, an Australian architectural firm
 Fillmore County Airport, in Minnesota, United States
 Karrakatta railway station, in Perth, Australia
 FKA Twigs (born 1988), English singer
 Roscosmos State Corporation, the governmental body responsible for the space science program of Russia